CSAI may refer to:

Catholic Scout Association in Israel
CernySmith Assessment, formerly known as the CernySmith Adjustment Index
Child pornography or child sexual abuse imagery
Commissione Sportiva Automobilistica Italiana, the commission which oversees the Automobile Club d'Italia